Carabus lefebvrei bayardi is a subspecies of bluish-black coloured ground beetle in the subfamily Carabinae that is endemic to Italy.

References

lefebvrei bayardi
Beetles described in 1826
Endemic fauna of Italy